Cryptocarya mackinnoniana is a species of  tree in the Lauraceae family. Growing up to 25m in size, it is found in well developed rainforests from the Iron Range area on Cape York Peninsula south to Paluma in North Queensland, Australia. It was first botanically described by Ferdinand von Mueller in Fragmenta Phytographiae Australiae 5: 169 (1865).

Description

The stem has a thin creamy to  pale brownish coloured layer which can usually be seen under the subrhytidome layer just outside of the stem's outer blaze. The twigs feature fluted grooves with a dense mixture of different hairs, the longer ones are tortuous whilst the shorter hairs have a more papillate form. 
The hairs range in colour from dark brown through to pale brown and usually sit erect and can remain on twigs which are quite old. Lenticels are also normally visible on the older twigs with a round and elongated appearance. The leaf blades have dimensions ranging from approximately 13-35 x 4.5-8.5 centimetres and have a slight glaucous layer underneath along with hairs which are tortuous, brown in colour and erect . On their upper surface the leaves have a  depressed midrib and petioles which can be ridged, flat or channelled. On the underside of the leaf blade reticulate veins are raised in a pronounced manner which forms a well defined network. The form of the flowers is paniculate and located beyond the leaves whilst their perfume has been often described as unpleasant. The perianth tube's inner surface is pubescent whilst the tepals are approximately 1.1-1.9 mm long and feature an outer surface which is also pubescent. The ovary usually has no hairs but is occasionally pubescent whilst the style is glabrous. The fruits feature spots with small pustules that usually have a form which is  ellipsoid but can occasionally be more ovoid or obpyriform.  The fruits are 19-28 x 13-17 mm in size with cotyledons that range from creamy to yellowish.

Seedlings

Seeds will germinate from 20 to 103 days. By the time they have reached the tenth leaf stage Cryptocarya mackinnoniana seedlings will have developed a slightly glaucous layer on the underside of their leaf blades. Young leaves feature hairs upon the top and underside whilst older leaves keep some very short hairs predominantly along the midrib on the upper surface. Oil dots are just visible under magnification.

Distribution and ecology

Flowering usually occurs between October–May and the fruit are eaten by many bird species and native rats.

Common names

Rusty Laurel, Rusty leaved Laurel, Mackinnon's walnut, Mackinnon's laurel and Rusty-leaved walnut.

References

mackinnoniana
Flora of Queensland
Taxa named by Ferdinand von Mueller
Plants described in 1865